Isabelle Noelle Mben Mbediang (born 5 January 1988) is a Cameroonian handball player for Konyaaltı Belediyesi SK and the Cameroonian national team.

She represented Cameroon at the 2017 World Women's Handball Championship in Germany.

References

1988 births
Living people
Cameroonian female handball players
Expatriate handball players in Turkey
Cameroonian expatriate sportspeople in Turkey
Competitors at the 2019 African Games
African Games competitors for Cameroon
African Games medalists in handball
20th-century Cameroonian women
21st-century Cameroonian women
African Games silver medalists for Cameroon